Martin Saxe (August 28, 1874 in New York City – February 5, 1967 in Manhattan, New York City) was an American lawyer and politician from New York.

Life
He was the son of Fabian Saxe and Theresa (Helburn) Saxe. He graduated from Princeton University in 1893.

Saxe was a member of the New York State Senate from 1905 to 1908, sitting in the 128th, 129th (both 17th D.), 130th and 131st New York State Legislatures (both 18th D.).

In April 1915, he was appointed to a three-year term as Chairman of the State Tax Commission.

He died on February 5, 1967, at his home at 101 Central Park West in Manhattan.

References

Sources
 Official New York from Cleveland to Hughes by Charles Elliott Fitch (Hurd Publishing Co., New York and Buffalo, 1911, Vol. IV; pg. 366)
 CONFIRM SAXE AND THOMAS in NYT on April 16, 1915
 MARTIN SAXE, 92, TAX LAWYER, DIES in NYT on February 6, 1967 (subscription required)

1874 births
1967 deaths
Republican Party New York (state) state senators
People from the Upper West Side
Princeton University alumni